Anne Burnaby was a British screenwriter and playwright.

Select filmography
Landfall (1949)
Young Wives' Tale (1951)
Father's Doing Fine (1952)
The Yellow Balloon (1953)
Young and Willing (1954)
No Time for Tears (1957)
Operation Bullshine (1959)
Sands of the Desert (1960)
Girl in a Birdcage (1962) (Armchair Theatre episode)

References

External links

English screenwriters
Year of birth missing
Year of death missing